Henry J. Giammarco (June 26, 1926 – October 28, 2004) was a Democratic member of the Pennsylvania House of Representatives.

References

2004 deaths
Democratic Party members of the Pennsylvania House of Representatives
1926 births
20th-century American politicians